Attock Cement Pakistan Limited, branded as Falcon Cement, was incorporated in Pakistan on October 14, 1981 as a Public Limited Company. The company is a subsidiary of Pharaon Investment Group Limited Holding S.A.L, Lebanon. Its main business activity is manufacturing and sale of cement. It is listed on the Pakistan Stock Exchange, with its trading symbol ‘ACPL’.

History 
Attock Cement (PSX: ACPL) is located in Hub, Balochistan, Pakistan. This company is one of the prominent manufacturers of cement with operations established in 1981 and commercial production starting in 1988 with a capacity of 0.6 million tons per annum. Attock cement is popularly known by its brand name Falcon Cement in Pakistan, which is supplied mainly to the southern parts of the country (lower Punjab and upper Sindh areas) as well as abroad through the sea ports of Pakistan.

Attock Cement went through a series of expansions, and now the company has a production capacity of 3 million tons annually as of 2018. Its market share in the south region is around 25 percent or more. The company is running three manufacturing plants at Hub, Balochistan facility with total production capacity of around 9 million tons per annum as of 2018.

Iraq Grinding Plant 
ACPL also made investment in a cement grinding unit in Iraq through a joint venture with the Iraq-based Al Keetan Commercial Agencies to form a subsidiary. ACPL holds 60 percent of the company. The mill has a capacity of 0.9 million tons.

Product Profile 
Attock Cement Pakistan Limited is principally engaged in manufacturing and sale of cement. The company is also engaged in exporting clinker and cement both in bags and bulk to the United Arab Emirates (UAE), Africa, Iraq, Sri Lanka and many other countries. The company also has the facility of supply of cement in bulk and also produces the low alkali cement for some regions of its market.

Company products
Falcon brand cement used in general construction
Sulfate resistant cement used in seaport and coastal areas because it provides resistance to chemical attack from sulfates and dissolved salts present in sea water

Its products include Ordinary Portland Cement (OPC), which is a product under the Falcon Brand used in all types of general construction. OPC can be used in concretes, mortars, grouts and premix concrete.

The company's Falcon Block Cement (FBC) product is offered for block and precast slab makers.

Certifications
ACPL is the first and only company that has Quality Control Lab that has been accredited ISO 17025 by Pakistan National Accreditation Council. Moreover, it is also QMS ISO 9001:2015, EMS ISO 14001:2015 and OHSAS 18001-2007 certified.

References

External links
Official website of Attock Cement

Companies listed on the Pakistan Stock Exchange
Pakistani subsidiaries of foreign companies
Cement companies of Pakistan
Manufacturing companies established in 1981
Manufacturing companies based in Karachi
Pakistani companies established in 1981